is a Japanese manga series by Kaoru Shintani that has been animated as an OVA and a television series in Japan.

Episodes

References
 Official TV Asahi Episode Guide, Part 1 (Archived)
 Official TV Asahi Episode Guide, Part 2 (Archived)

Area 88